Kenneth Welsh,  (March 30, 1942 – May 5, 2022) was a Canadian film and television actor. He was best known as the multi-faceted villain Windom Earle in Twin Peaks, for his roles in the films The Day After Tomorrow, Adoration, Survival of the Dead, and, as the father of Katharine Hepburn (portrayed by Cate Blanchett), in Martin Scorsese's The Aviator.

Early life
Welsh was born in Edmonton, Alberta, to a father who worked for the Canadian National Railway. He grew up in Alberta and studied drama at school. He later moved to Montreal and attended the National Theatre School. Following graduation, he auditioned for the Stratford Festival in Ontario and then spent the first seven years of his career on stage.

Career
Welsh has portrayed historical figures including Thomas E. Dewey, Colin Thatcher, Harry S. Truman (twice), Thomas Edison, James "Scotty" Reston, General Harry Crerar and James Baker. He made guest appearances on the acclaimed TV series Due South and Slings & Arrows.

He was a two-time Genie Award nominee for Best Actor, receiving nods at the 6th Genie Awards in 1985 for his portrayal of Reno Colt in the film Reno and the Doc and at the 8th Genie Awards in 1987 for his performance as David Sutton in Loyalties, and a two-time Genie nominee for Best Supporting Actor, receiving a nomination at the 5th Genie Awards in 1984 for Tell Me That You Love Me and winning the award at the 16th Genie Awards in 1996 for Margaret's Museum.

Reno and the Doc was written and directed by Charles Dennis; in 1997, Welsh directed Dennis in the latter's play SoHo Duo at the West Bank Theatre in New York City.

In 2003, he was made a Member of the Order of Canada.

His role as the vice-president of the United States in the 2004 environmental disaster film The Day After Tomorrow sparked some controversy due to his physical resemblance to Dick Cheney, the real-life vice-president at the time. Director Roland Emmerich later confirmed that he deliberately chose Welsh for that very reason. Emmerich stated that the character of the vice-president in the film was intended to be a not-so-subtle criticism of the environmental policies of the George W. Bush administration.

Personal life
Welsh had recently married Lynne Mcilvride in a civil ceremony at his house near Toronto.

A follower of American spiritual teacher Adi Da, who primarily focused on prioritizing spiritual enlightenment, Welsh narrated Da's 2000 audiobook, "What, Where, When, How, Why, and Who to Remember to Be Happy".

Welsh died on May 5, 2022, at the age of 80, from cancer. His son Devon, the lead singer of the now-defunct musical group Majical Cloudz, announced on Twitter: "My dad passed away on Thursday peacefully at home. I will always love him beyond words. He lived a wonderful life, he was the best father I could have asked for, and he touched so many lives. Please make a toast, watch a film/TV show he was in, celebrate a giant of acting." His ashes were sprinkled in Lake Ontario following cremation.

Filmography

Film

Television

References

External links

 

1942 births
2022 deaths
Canadian male film actors
Canadian male television actors
Canadian male voice actors
Best Supporting Actor Genie and Canadian Screen Award winners
Members of the Order of Canada
Male actors from Edmonton
20th-century Canadian male actors
21st-century Canadian male actors
Canadian people of British descent
Canadian emigrants to the United States
Best Supporting Actor in a Drama Series Canadian Screen Award winners